Pierre Larrouturou (born 1964) is a French economist and politician who has been serving as a Member of the European Parliament since 2019. He previously was a regional councilor of the Île-de-France.

Political career

Early beginnings 
While still a consultant for the accounting firm Arthur Andersen, Larrouturou first entered national politics in 1993 by issuing a widely discussed 54-page manifesto advocating for a switch to a four-day workweek in France.

Member of the European Parliament, 2019–present 
In parliament, Larrouturou has been serving on the Committee on Budgets since 2019. In this capacity, he was his parliamentary group’s rapporteur on the budget of the European Union for 2021.

In addition to his committee assignments, Larrouturou is part of the parliament's delegations to the Israel and to the EU-Ukraine Parliamentary Association Committee. He is also a member of the Spinelli Group and the European Parliament Intergroup on Climate Change, Biodiversity and Sustainable Development.

In 2020, Larrouturou made headlines when he went on hunger strike to demand the EU introduce a financial transaction tax by 2024 and to protest against budget plans that downgraded programs on health, research and climate change.

Controversy 
In October 2019, visitors to the European Parliament whom Larrouturou had allowed to enter the building misbehaved. Larrouturou was subsequently sanctioned for his guests’ breach of the rules, specifically those that forbid the compromising of “the smooth conduct of parliamentary business and [...] the maintenance of security and order on Parliament’s premises or the functioning of its equipment.”

Personal life 
Larrouturou is married and has two children.

References 

1964 births
Members of the European Parliament for France
French economists
Living people
People from Périgueux
Socialist Party (France) MEPs